Peter Dawson Gordon (August 16, 1882 – June 26, 1975) was a Canadian sailor who competed in the 1932 Summer Olympics. Born in Ontario he was a crew member of the Canadian boat Santa Maria which won the silver medal in the 8 metre class in 1932. He died in Vancouver.

External links
Peter Gordon's profile at databaseOlympics
Peter Gordon's profile at Sports Reference.com

1882 births
1975 deaths
Canadian male sailors (sport)
Olympic sailors of Canada
Olympic silver medalists for Canada
Sailors at the 1932 Summer Olympics – 8 Metre
Olympic medalists in sailing
Medalists at the 1932 Summer Olympics